Saint-Trojan-les-Bains is a commune in the Charente-Maritime department in southwestern France. It is situated in the south of the island Oléron.

Population

See also
Communes of the Charente-Maritime department

References

Communes of Charente-Maritime
Oléron
Populated coastal places in France